The 2007–08 HV71 season began September 24, 2007 against Frölunda HC. It was the club's 24th season in the Swedish elite league Elitserien.

After winning their game against Modo Hockey in overtime on February 28, HV71 clinched the regular season league title, for a total of three times. HV71 won the playoffs on April 18, winning the sixth game in the finals by 3-2 and the series 4-2 against Linköpings HC. This was their third time becoming Swedish Champions in the club's history.

Regular season

Standings

Game log

Playoffs
HV71 ended the 2007–08 regular season as the league winner and first seed. HV71 chose to meet the eight seed, Skellefteå AIK, in the quarterfinals and defeated them in five games. HV71 played the fifth seed, Timrå IK, in the semifinals. Timrå was defeated in six games. In the finals HV71 defeated Linköpings HC, the second seed, in six games, winning the series with 4-2.

Player stats

Skaters
Note: GP = Games played; G = Goals; A = Assists; Pts = Points; +/- = Plus/minus; PIM = Penalties in Minutes

Regular season

Playoffs

Goaltenders
Note: GP = Games played; TOI = Time on ice (minutes); W = Wins; L = Losses; T = Ties; OTW = Overtime Wins; OTL = Overtime Losses GA = Goals against; SO = Shutouts; Sv% = Save percentage; GAA = Goals against average

Regular season

Playoffs

Transactions

Roster

Draft picks
HV71 players picked at the 2008 NHL Entry Draft in Ottawa, Ontario, Canada.

References

Player stats (regular season): HV71 player stats on Hockeyligan.se
Player stats (playoff): HV71 player stats on Hockeyligan.se

Team standings: Elitserien standings on Hockeyligan.se

2007-08
HV71